Gregory M. Cochran (born 1953) is an American anthropologist and author who argues that cultural innovation resulted in new and constantly shifting selection pressures for genetic change, thereby accelerating human evolution and divergence between human races. From 2004 to 2015, he was a research associate at the anthropology department at the University of Utah. He is co-author of the book The 10,000 Year Explosion.

Human evolution 
In opposition to what he sees as the conventional wisdom that civilization has been a static environment which imposed stabilizing selection on humans, Cochran, along with like-minded anthropologists such as John D. Hawks, contends that haplotype and other data indicate the selection of genes has been strongest since the advent of farming and civilization.

Ashkenazi Jewish intelligence 
Cochran and co-authors Jason Hardy and Henry Harpending suggest that the high average IQ of Ashkenazi Jews may be attributed to natural selection for intelligence during the Middle Ages and a low rate of genetic inflow. Cochran and his colleagues hypothesize that the occupational profile of the Jewish community in medieval Europe had resulted in selection pressure for mutations that increase intelligence, but can also result in hereditary neurological disorders. Cochran was featured in an episode of the Norwegian television show Hjernevask (in English: "Brainwash") in which he discusses race and intelligence, using Ashkenazi intelligence as compared to the rest of the Israeli Jewish population as an example of differences between groups.

Pathogenic infections as a cause of disease 
In 2000, Cochran and evolutionary biologist Paul W. Ewald co-authored a paper in which they proposed that most human diseases were the result of pathogenic infections (viruses, bacteria, parasites). They argue that most fitness-reducing diseases would be eliminated through natural selection, but since germs can evolve faster than humans, they are a likely culprit. Cochran and Ewald point to stomach ulcers, which were once thought to be caused by a variety of environmental factors such as smoking, diet and drugs, but were later attributed to bacteria.

Pathogenic hypothesis of homosexuality 

Cochran has argued that homosexuality may be considered a disease because it generally reduces or eliminates reproductive output, and he and Ewald have speculated that homosexuality might be caused by infection with an unknown virus. However, he does not suggest that the infectious agent that causes homosexuality is spread by homosexuals. Cochran's hypothesis is based on the argument that homosexuality is unlikely to be genetic because it does not follow simple Mendelian inheritance patterns and because natural selection should have largely eliminated genes that cause homosexuality. Cochran says that there is no positive evidence for the gay germ hypothesis. In 1999, journalist Caleb Crain published an article in the gay magazine Out in which he spoke with several sexual orientation researchers about the hypothesis. Geneticist Dean Hamer called it an "interesting idea" which would need to be tested by experimentation, but that he was skeptical about finding evidence since homosexuality doesn't appear in clusters. J. Michael Bailey was skeptical of how research to test the hypothesis could even be carried out, but reportedly gives Cochran the "benefit of the doubt". Bailey also said that if the hypothesis was true, calling it a disease would be an "illegitimate conclusion", since not all traits caused by pathogens are diseases, and said that if some form of genius was caused by an infection, the same conclusion would not be drawn. Elaine F. Walker, who has carried out research tying schizophrenia with a pathogenic infection during prenatal development, said that Cochran's hypothesis "doesn't seem very likely" and it didn't seem to match the etiology of schizophrenia.

Most researchers in mainstream biology believe sexual orientation likely results from a complex interplay of genetic, hormonal, and non-social environmental factors. Examples include the fraternal birth order effect related to male sexual orientation; a progressive immunization of the mother that could alter male specific cells that play a role in fetal brain synapse masculinization, for which biochemical evidence has been found. An epigenetic model for homosexuality as a result of prenatal environment was proposed by three evolutionary biologists (Rice et al.) in 2012, and accounts for fitness costs, noting a host of reproductive fitness reducing traits associated with genitalia which persist at rates similar to, or higher than, exclusive homosexual orientation. In a 2017 commentary, the biologists write that "one of the most counterintuitive results" from their model of homosexuality was that the epi-marks responsible for homosexuality should always be favoured in the fetus, because in most offspring, they canalize sexual development and protect the fetus from fitness-reducing intersex phenotypes. However, sometimes unerased epimarks expressed in the brain could pass from a mother to son which would effect sex differentiation of the fetal brain, resulting in homosexuality. Nevertheless, epigenetic explanations for sexual orientation are still purely speculative. W. Rice and colleagues say that they "cannot provide definitive evidence that homosexuality has a epigenetic underpinning". Tuck C. Ngun and Eric Vilain published a paper in 2014 in which they evaluated and critiqued the epigenetic model proposed by Rice and colleagues in 2012. Ngun and Vilain agreed with much of Rice's model, but disagreed that "sex-reversing sensitivity to androgen signaling via epigenetic markers will result in homosexuality in both sexes", saying that there is no evidence that same-sex attraction in men is linked to low androgenic receptivity. Evolutionary ecologist Aldo Poiani said that the pathogenic hypothesis should "not be dismissed without proper testing", but that it seems contradicted by birth order effects, a consistent low rate of homosexuality across populations and the absence of parent-child transmission.

References

External links 
 West Hunter, Cochran and Harpending's blog.
 Researchers Say Intelligence and Diseases May Be Linked in Ashkenazic Genes. The New York Times, June 3, 2005

1953 births
Living people
American anthropologists
American biophysicists
Race and intelligence controversy
Proponents of scientific racism
University of Illinois Urbana-Champaign alumni
University of Utah faculty